Hubberts Bridge railway station serves the village of Hubberts Bridge in Lincolnshire, England. Opened along with the line by the Boston, Sleaford and Midland Counties Railway in 1859, The eastbound platform is longer than the westbound platform: it can accommodate a three-car train, whereas the westbound platform can only accommodate a two-car train.

The station is now owned by Network Rail and managed by East Midlands Railway  who provide all rail services.

A signal box at the West end of the station supervises a level crossing and the western end of the single track section from Boston. However, the station itself is unstaffed and offers limited facilities other than two shelters, bicycle storage, timetables and modern 'Help Points'. The full range of tickets for travel are purchased from the guard on the train at no extra cost, there are no retail facilities at this station.

Services
All services at Hubberts Bridge are operated by East Midlands Railway.

On weekdays and Saturdays, the station is served by a limited service of two trains per day in each direction, westbound to  via  and eastbound to  via .

There is no Sunday service at the station, although a normal service operates on most Bank Holidays.

References

External links

Railway stations in Lincolnshire
DfT Category F2 stations
Former Great Northern Railway stations
Railway stations in Great Britain opened in 1859
Railway stations served by East Midlands Railway